Shelby Kramp-Neuman is a Canadian politician. She was elected as the Member of Parliament for the federal electoral district of Hastings—Lennox and Addington in the House of Commons of Canada at the 2021 Canadian federal election.

Biography
Kramp-Neuman was raised in Madoc, Ontario. She was educated at the University of Ottawa where she studied Communications and Political Science. Prior to being elected, she worked as a financial advisor for Sun Life. She has also been a legislative assistant for Jim Prentice and Senator Consiglio Di Nino. She has also worked as a teacher at Loyalist College and with the Hastings & Prince Edward District School Board and has served on the Centre Hastings Municipal Council. She is married and has two children.

She is the daughter of former MP and Ontario MPP Daryl Kramp.

Electoral record

References

External links

Living people
Conservative Party of Canada MPs
Members of the House of Commons of Canada from Ontario
Place of birth missing (living people)
Women members of the House of Commons of Canada
21st-century Canadian politicians
21st-century Canadian women politicians
People from Hastings County
University of Ottawa alumni
Financial advisors
Canadian schoolteachers
Ontario municipal councillors
1978 births